Athoumane Solihi (born 30 March 1991) is a Comorian swimmer. He competed in the men's 50 metre freestyle event at the 2016 Summer Olympics, where he ranked 76th with a time of 27.31 seconds. He did not advance to the semifinals.

References

1991 births
Living people
Comorian male freestyle swimmers
Olympic swimmers of the Comoros
Swimmers at the 2016 Summer Olympics
Place of birth missing (living people)